Kepler-33b is an extrasolar planet orbiting Kepler-33 in the constellation Cygnus. It is one of five planets orbiting  Kepler-33.

Discovery
Kepler-33b was, along with twenty-six other planets in eleven different planetary systems, confirmed to be a planet on January 26, 2012.

The Kepler-33 system
Kepler-33b orbits its host star with 4 other planets. All five planets orbit its star closer than Mercury does to the Sun. Of those five, Kepler-33b is closest. All Kepler-33 planets are too close to be in the habitable zone.

See also
 List of planets discovered by the Kepler spacecraft

References

Exoplanets discovered by the Kepler space telescope
Exoplanets discovered in 2012
Transiting exoplanets

Cygnus (constellation)